Ormside railway station was a station at Ormside, England, on the Midland Railway Settle-Carlisle Line.

Station
Original proposals suggested a Station at Asby, the next parish south of Ormside. Later representation from local landowners resulted in the site being moved to this location. It was closed by the British Transport Commission on 2 June 1952 and the platforms subsequently demolished - the station building has however survived and is used as an education centre, whilst the line remains in use for both freight & passenger traffic.

Signal box
A signal box was bought into use in 1907. It was 16 ft x 8 ft., with a 16 lever frame. 
The box closed on 8 March 1960. 
Official records imply that, from 1886, a frame of 10 levers was worked from the station.

Notes

References

Houghton, F.W & Foster W.H (1965 Second Ed) The Story Of The Settle - Carlisle Line, Advertiser Press Ltd, Huddersfield.

Disused railway stations in Cumbria
Former Midland Railway stations
Railway stations in Great Britain opened in 1876
Railway stations in Great Britain closed in 1952